Mucuk is a small village in Mut district of Mersin Province, Turkey. Population of Mucuk was 100 as of 2012.

References

Villages in Mut District